Gladys Wamuyu Wachiuri (born 23 December 1972) is a retired Kenyan middle-distance runner competing primarily in the 800 metres. She represented her country at the 1992 Summer Olympics. In addition, she won the bronze medal at the 1994 Commonwealth Games.

Competition record

Personal bests
800 metres – 2:00.32 (Algiers 2000)
1000 metres – 2:42.98 (Nice 2000)
1500 metres – 4:11.94 (Brisbane 2000)

References

1972 births
Living people
Kenyan female middle-distance runners
Athletes (track and field) at the 1992 Summer Olympics
Athletes (track and field) at the 1994 Commonwealth Games
Athletes (track and field) at the 1998 Commonwealth Games
Olympic athletes of Kenya
World Athletics Championships athletes for Kenya
Commonwealth Games medallists in athletics
Commonwealth Games bronze medallists for Kenya
African Games bronze medalists for Kenya
African Games medalists in athletics (track and field)
Athletes (track and field) at the 1991 All-Africa Games
Medallists at the 1994 Commonwealth Games